Mercedes-Benz has sold a number of automobiles with the "190" model name:
 1955–1963 W121
 1955–1963 Mercedes-Benz 190SL
 1956–1959 190
 
 1958–1959 190D
 1959–1961 190b
 1959–1961 190Db
 1962–1965 W110
 1962–1965 190c
 1962–1965 190Dc
 1984–1993 W201
 1984–1986 190D 2.2
 1984–1993 190E 2.3
 1986–1987 190E 2.3-16
 1987 190D 2.5 Turbo
 1987–1991 190D 2.5
 1987–1993 190E 2.6

190